George O'Connor (born November 5, 1973) is an American-born author, cartoonist and illustrator living in Brooklyn.

Career

O'Connor's first picture book, Kapow!, was a New York Times bestseller.

His first graphic novel, Journey into Mohawk Country, was published in 2006. It uses as its sole text an English translation of the journal kept by the Dutch barber/surgeon/explorer Harmen Meyndertsz van den Bogaert, who in 1634 journeyed from what is now Albany, New York 100 miles into the interior of the North American continent. This journal is one of the earliest extant accounts of the Iroquois people.

O'Connor followed up Journey with his work on Ball Peen Hammer, the first graphic novel written by famed playwright Adam Rapp. Set in the near future of an unnamed city after a societal collapse, the story follows the lives and loves of a handful of survivors.

He also storyboarded and contributed illustrations for the "graphic novel" portions of the ABC news special Earth 2100.

O'Connor is currently working on Olympians, a projected 12-book series retelling the Greek Myths in a graphic novel format, with one book for each Olympian god. The first volume, Zeus: King of the Gods, was published in January 2010. It concluded on March 8, 2022, with the final book Dionysos: The New God. He is currently working on a four-book series on the Norse gods entitled Asgardians, with the first being on Odin.

Bibliography

Picture books
 Sally and the Some-Thing (2006)
 Kapow! (2007)
 Uncle Bigfoot (2008)
 Ker-Splash! (2010)
 If I Had a Raptor (2014)
 If I Had a Triceratops (2015)
 Captain Awesome series (illustrator)

Graphic novels
 Journey into Mohawk Country, written by Harmen Meyndertsz van den Bogaert (September 5, 2006)
 Ball Peen Hammer, written by Adam Rapp (September 29, 2009)
 Olympians series
 Book 1: Zeus: King of the Gods (January 5, 2010)
 Book 2: Athena: Grey-Eyed Goddess (April 13, 2010)
 Book 3: Hera: The Goddess and Her Glory (July 19, 2011)
 Book 4: Hades: Lord of the Dead (January 31, 2012)
 Book 5: Poseidon: Earth Shaker (March 19, 2013)
 Book 6: Aphrodite: Goddess of Love (December 31, 2013)
 Boxed Set: Includes the first six books in the series (October 7, 2014)
 Book 7: Ares: Bringer of War (January 27, 2015) 
 Book 8: Apollo: The Brilliant One (January 26, 2016) 
 Book 9: Artemis: Wild Goddess of the Hunt  (January 31, 2017)
 Book 10: Hermes: Tales of the Trickster (January 30, 2018)
 Book 11: Hephaistos: God of Fire (January 29, 2019) 
 Book 12: Dionysos: The New God (March 8, 2022)
 Boxed Set: Includes books seven through twelve in the series (March 8, 2022)
 Unrig: How to Fix Our Broken Democracy (World Citizen Comics), written by Daniel G. Newman (July 7, 2020)

Note

References

External links
 George O'Connor's Official website
 Olympians Series Official Website
 The first 13 pages of Ball Peen Hammer
 George O'Connor interview on the Leonard Lopate show
 New York Times review of Kapow!
 New York Times feature on the making of Journey into Mohawk Country

Living people
1973 births